Over the Edge is an American coming-of-age crime drama film directed by Jonathan Kaplan and released in May 1979. The film, based on actual events, had a limited theatrical release but has since achieved cult film status. It was Matt Dillon's film debut.

Plot 
In the fictional isolated planned community of New Granada, east of Denver, Colorado, Carl Willat  and his friends Richie White, Claude Zachary, and Claude's younger brother Johnny hang out at "the Rec" (Recreation Center), the only place for adolescents to recreate together, supervised by Rec counselor Julia Vogel.

Atop an overpass, Mark Perry and his friend shoot a BB hole in the windshield of a passing patrol car and flee on their bikes, passing Carl and Richie and telling them to hide. Sergeant Ed Doberman arrives shortly, spots them and finds a pocket knife on Richie. He apprehends them and notifies Carl's father Fred, a local businessman. After questioning the pair about the BB gun, Doberman lectures Carl about potential imprisonment in "the Hill", a juvenile detention facility.

The next day, during an assembly in the school's cafeteria about the previous day's events, Carl meets and befriends Cory. That evening, Carl asks about the land opposite the Rec, and Fred explains that Homeowners Association president Jerry Cole wants wealthy landowner Mr. Sloan to buy the land and build an industrial park there instead of the planned twin cinema and roller rink and bowling alley, infuriating Carl.

At the playground, Claude buys a gram of hash from Tip. The group relocates to a nearby house after notification about a party there. Carl witnesses Cory making out with Mark, who warns him against mentioning his name to the cops. After Doberman arrives and announces the 9:30pm curfew, Carl walks home alone, unknowingly followed and assaulted by Mark and his friend. His parents catch him, interrupting their meeting with Cole.

The next day, Doberman visits the Rec; ignoring Julia's objections, he finds drugs on Claude and apprehends him. He emerges to find Richie atop the patrol car, who escapes. Richie and Carl encounter Cory and her friend Abby, who have just stolen a pistol from a house. At a half-finished townhouse that the boys call their condo, they plan a 'picnic with a gun' the next day. Noticing Mr. Sloan's car at his house, Carl plants firecrackers under the hood, which detonate as the men are departing, sabotaging Sloan's plans.

At the picnic, the teenagers alternate shooting until the ammunition runs out. Later, Claude explains that Tip sold him the hash, and Cory reveals Tip's recent arrest. Under interrogation, Tip confesses he told Doberman about giving Claude hash. When Carl gets home, his mother Sandra forbids him to see his friends and explains that the Rec will be closed until a new replacement counselor is found, further angering him.

The next day, after overhears Tip's mother naming her son's assailants, Carl grabs Richie and they run to Richie's house, where Richie grabs the pistol and the keys to his mother's Bronco. Doberman chases them; they flip the Bronco and split up. After Doberman fires a warning shot, Richie points his unloaded pistol at him and Doberman kills Richie. Carl escapes to the condo, and Cory later meets him there and they spend the night together. The next morning, en route home to grab money, Carl spots and shoots Mark in the shoulder with the BB gun, causing him to crash his dirt bike; the pair argue, then reconcile. Carl goes home, sneaks in and after seeing his mother on the phone discussing a community meeting about the adolescents at the school occurring that night, flees to the Rec, meeting up with his friends.

Deciding to confront the parents during the meeting, the adolescents chain the doors and begin lighting fireworks and trashing the school. After beginning to destroy cars in the parking lot, they break open a patrol car and pull out guns, eventually blowing up several cars and starting fires. Police later arrive and the teenagers disperse, with Doberman apprehending Carl. Waiting down the road, Mark shoots Doberman's car, causing it to crash into the Rec and catch fire. Carl escapes, leaving the unconscious Doberman inside the car to perish in a massive explosion.

The next morning, Carl boards a bus  bound for the Hill with the other adolescents involved in the vandalism. As the bus clears an overpass, Carl smiles upon seeing Claude, Johnny, and Cory waving down to them.

Cast

 Michael Kramer as Carl Willat
 Matt Dillon as Richie White
 Pamela Ludwig as Cory
 Harry Northup as Sgt. Doberman
 Vincent Spano as Mark Perry
 Tom Fergus as Claude Zachary
 Andy Romano as Fred Willat
 Ellen Geer as Sandra Willat
 Richard Jamison as Cole
 Julia Pomeroy as Julia

Production 
The film was inspired by events described in a 1973 San Francisco Examiner article entitled "Mousepacks: Kids on a Crime Spree" by Bruce Koon and James A. Finefrock, which reported on young kids vandalizing property in Foster City, California. The middle class planned community had an unusually high level of juvenile crime. Screenwriters Charles S. Haas and Tim Hunter began work shortly after the article's publication, including field research in the town itself where they interviewed some of the kids. Hunter said that the script accurately reflected the article with the exception of a more violent ending.

Orion Pictures helped finance the film; producer George Litto borrowed an additional $1 million. Director Jonathan Kaplan, who was just 30 when hired, took a documentary approach to filming and hired unknown actors. Among them was Matt Dillon, then age 14, whom the filmmakers discovered in a middle school in Westchester County, New York. This was Dillon's feature film debut. Shooting took place over 20 days in 1978 in the Colorado cities of Aurora and Greeley.

Release 
Due to the negative publicity surrounding a wave of recent youth gang films such as The Warriors and Boulevard Nights, Over the Edge was given a limited theatrical release in 1979. It debuted on May 18, 1979 in eight cities in the United States on a test run basis, with the biggest release in Charlotte, North Carolina.

Soundtrack 
Side one
 "Surrender" – Cheap Trick
 "My Best Friend's Girl" – The Cars
 "You Really Got Me" – Van Halen
 "Speak Now or Forever Hold Your Peace" – Cheap Trick
 "Come On (Part 1)" – Jimi Hendrix
Side two
 "Just What I Needed" – The Cars
 "Hello There" – Cheap Trick
 "Teenage Lobotomy" – Ramones
 "Downed" – Cheap Trick
 "All That You Dream" – Little Feat
 "Ooh Child" – Valerie Carter

In a 1978 interview between Eddie Van Halen and journalist Steve Rosen where the Van Halen guitarist discusses the song "Light Up the Sky," he explained, "Warner Bros. is financing some movie, and they wanted us to write the theme song for it and we were thinking of using that song." While not mentioning the movie by name, Van Halen later describes it as  "A neat movie - everyone's going to relate to that. It's high school kids up north in New Granada, some new housing development. They destroy everything, they lock it...they had a PTA meeting, because all the parents were getting together to talk about their problems they were having with all the students and kids destroying the town. And then while all the people were in there, they lock them in, they chain the doors with all the cops inside and stuff. They went out and started smashing the cars and blowing everything up - it was insane...It was supposed to be a true story. So I think maybe the title of that kind of sprung from that. Because it was a real trippy movie, and it would be a good title calling it 'Light Up the Sky.' Because the last scene of the movie was heavy, boy - it’s just a big flash of flame type of thing." Ultimately, the band opted not to give the song to the film, because Van Halen says in the same interview, "We went and saw a screening of the flick...and it ain't gonna win no Academy Award or nothing." Instead, the song was included on the album Van Halen II.

Reception and legacy 
On review aggregate website Rotten Tomatoes, Over the Edge has an approval rating of 83% based on 12 critics' reviews.

Vincent Canby of The New York Times gave the movie a positive review, stating, "It's to Mr. Kaplan's credit that he makes New Granada look just as boring and alienated to us as it does to the unfortunate children who live there." Roger Ebert said the film's "violent climax is particularly unconvincing," but the movie captures the "feeling of teen-age frustration and paranoia...and the rhythms of teen-age life...how kids talk and feel and yearn, about the maddening sensation of occupying a body with adolescent values but adult emotions."  Ebert concluded the film "does an uncanny job of portraying these kids in a recognizable, convincing way." Both Ebert and Gene Siskel were mixed on an episode of the movie review series Sneak Previews. The performances of Dillon, Michael Kramer, and Pamela Ludwig were also praised by critics. 

Richard Labonté of the Ottawa Citizen wrote, "The strength of Over the Edge, and what set it apart...from most of the gang films of the late '70s, was Kaplan's ability to portray more than merely juvenile violence: his kid actors trash their school with the best of them, but the seething reasons for their behavior is discussed and explored and assessed, rather than merely exploited...capturing with discretion and with discernment the anger of suburban sterility and the dependence on the deadening effect of dope."

The film has since gained cult film status. In late 1981, it was shown at "Film at Joseph Papp's Public Theater" as part of "Word of Mouth", a program devoted to films that had been overlooked because of poor marketing or distribution. This screening led to it being listed on critical top-10 lists, and it was favorably reviewed by Vincent Canby at The New York Times. The film then re-emerged in the 1980s with showings on cable, including HBO and a videocassette release in 1989.

In a 2000 review for The Austin Chronicle, Mike Emery said the film is "a vibrant depiction of confused teen life." The Chicago Reader wrote, "Director Jonathan Kaplan has a fine feel for the crushing blandness of 'planned communities'—the anger that possesses his underage heroes proceeds from a physically oppressive emptiness, represented by rows of hollow town houses and vast, blasted fields. Part wish fulfillment and part social moralizing, the film never resolves its point of view, but a few of the apocalyptic images stay in the mind."

A novelization of the film by Charlie Haas and Tim Hunter was published by Grove Press alongside the film's release. Included in the book are 32 pages of photographs from the shooting of the film. The book is long out of print.

Director Richard Linklater has said Over the Edge influenced his 1993 film Dazed and Confused. Over the Edge also partly inspired the music videos for the songs "Smells Like Teen Spirit" by Nirvana and "Evil Eye" by Fu Manchu.

In 2021, entertainment website Yardbarker named Over the Edge the “signature film” of the city of Denver.

References

External links
 
 
 

 An interview with co-writer Tim Hunter

1970s coming-of-age drama films
1979 crime drama films
1979 films
American coming-of-age drama films
American crime drama films
American independent films
1970s English-language films
Films about drugs
Films directed by Jonathan Kaplan
Teen crime films
Films set in Colorado
Films shot in Colorado
Orion Pictures films
Teensploitation
Films scored by Sol Kaplan
Films based on newspaper and magazine articles
1979 independent films
1970s American films
1970s teen drama films
American teen drama films